Warm Springs Mill, also known as Miller Mill and Inn at Gristmill Square, is a historic grist mill complex and national historic district located at Warm Springs, Bath County, Virginia. It was built in 1901, and is a three-story, gable-roofed frame building, with an iron overshot Fitz water wheel with the original
mill race.  The mill remained in operation until 1971, after which it was renovated for use as a restaurant and bed and breakfast.

It was listed on the National Register of Historic Places in 1989.

References

External links
Inn at Gristmill Square website

Bed and breakfasts in Virginia
Grinding mills on the National Register of Historic Places in Virginia
Historic districts on the National Register of Historic Places in Virginia
Industrial buildings completed in 1901
Buildings and structures in Bath County, Virginia
National Register of Historic Places in Bath County, Virginia
Grinding mills in Virginia
1901 establishments in Virginia